Chevigney-sur-l'Ognon (literally Chevigney on the Ognon) is a commune in the Doubs department in the Bourgogne-Franche-Comté region in eastern France.

Population

See also
 Ognon (Franche-Comté)
 Communes of the Doubs department

References

Communes of Doubs